Banie is a village in Poland.

Banie may also refer to:
Banie (island), one of the Solomon Islands
Banié, a town in Guinea